HD 30177 is an 8th magnitude star located approximately 182 light-years (56 parsecs) away in the constellation Dorado. The star is a yellow dwarf, a type of yellow star that fuses hydrogen in its core. Since if this star is a late G-type, it is cooler and less massive than the Sun, but larger in radius. It is 1.8 times older than the Sun. This star system contains two known extrasolar planets.

Planetary system
The Anglo-Australian Planet Search team announced the discovery of HD 30177 b, which has a minimum mass 8 times that of Jupiter, on June 13, 2002. The scientific paper describing the discovery was published in The Astrophysical Journal in 2003. A second massive gas giant planet was later discovered in an approximately 32 year orbit. In 2022, the inclination and true mass of both planets were measured via astrometry.

See also
 List of extrasolar planets
 Pi Mensae

References

External links
 

G-type main-sequence stars
Planetary systems with two confirmed planets
Dorado (constellation)
Durchmusterung objects
030177
021850